USS Narcissus – a screw steamer launched in July 1863 as Mary Cook at East Albany, N.Y. – was purchased by the Union Navy at New York City on 23 September 1863 from James D. Stevenson; and commissioned at New York Navy Yard on 2 February 1864, Acting Ensign William G. Jones in command.

On 19 October 2018, the shipwreck was added to the National Register of Historic Places.

Civil War
The new tug soon got underway south; and touched at Port Royal, South Carolina for fuel on 14 February, before pushing on to the Gulf of Mexico. She joined the West Gulf Blockading Squadron at New Orleans late in the month and was assigned to patrol and blockade duty in Mississippi Sound. On the morning of 24 August, she captured sloop Oregon in Biloxi Bay, Mississippi Sound, and took the prize to New Orleans for adjudication.

Subsequently ordered to Mobile Bay, Narcissus supported clean-up operations following the great Union naval victory there on 5 August. She struck a Confederate torpedo off Mobile in a heavy storm on 7 December and sank within 15 minutes without loss of life.

Raised in the closing days of 1864, Narcissus was repaired at Pensacola early in 1865 and served in the gulf as a dispatch boat through the end of the war. She departed Pensacola on New Year's Day 1866, was wrecked, and sank at Egmont Key, Florida on 4 January with loss of all on board.

Consideration as Florida's twelfth Underwater Archaeological Preserve
In December 2011, The Bureau of Archaeological Research, Division of Historical Resources, Florida Department of State, initiated a proposal to dedicate the wreck site of the Narcissus as Florida's twelfth Underwater Archaeological Preserve. The proposal was accepted and the shipwreck became an Underwater Archaeological Preserve in January 2015.

References

External links

 Photos from Narcissus prop shaft leading to the prop assembly, prop, engine, hull: 

 

1863 ships
American Civil War patrol vessels of the United States
Florida Underwater Archaeological Preserves
Gunboats of the United States Navy
Maritime incidents in December 1864
Maritime incidents in January 1866
National Register of Historic Places in Hillsborough County, Florida
Ships built in Albany, New York
Ships of the Union Navy
Ships sunk by mines
Shipwrecks of the Alabama coast
Shipwrecks of the Florida coast
Shipwrecks on the National Register of Historic Places in Florida
Steamships of the United States Navy